The St. Clair Bayfield Award was established in 1973 by the Actors' Equity Association in honor of St. Clair Bayfield to recognize Shakespearean actors and actresses of the New York metropolitan area.

References

External links
 St Clair Bayfield Awards

Shakespearean actors
American theater awards
Actors' Equity Association